Jackson's or Jacksons may refer to:
 Jackson's House, student-body subdivision at Canadian secondary school Upper Canada College
 Jackson's (restaurant), in Perth, Western Australia
 Jacksons Stores, a British convenience store chain
 William Jackson Food Group, a food manufacturer in the United Kingdom 
 Jacksons (department store), a department store chain in the United Kingdom
 Jacksons Corner, a prominent landmark in Reading, Berkshire, England
 Jacksons, British Columbia, a settlement in British Columbia, Canada 
 Jacksons, New Zealand, a settlement in New Zealand

See also
 Jackson (disambiguation)
 The Jacksons (disambiguation)